John V. Hendry is a former chief justice of the Nebraska Supreme Court, appointed from the state at large in 1998.  He received both a B.S. and J.D. from the University of Nebraska-Lincoln, and was admitted to the bar in 1974.  He served as a County Court Judge of the Third District from 1995 to 1998.  His service as Chief Justice ended October 2, 2006.

See also
Nebraska Supreme Court

References
 

Year of birth missing (living people)
Living people
University of Nebraska–Lincoln alumni
Nebraska state court judges
Chief Justices of the Nebraska Supreme Court